The 1995 Penn State Nittany Lions football team represented the Pennsylvania State University in the 1995 NCAA Division I-A football season. The team was coached by Joe Paterno and played its home games in Beaver Stadium in University Park, Pennsylvania.

Schedule

Roster

Game summaries

Texas Tech

Temple

Rutgers

Wisconsin

Ohio State

Purdue

Iowa

Indiana

Northwestern

Michigan

Michigan State

Outback Bowl

NFL Draft
Ten Nittany Lions were drafted in the 1996 NFL Draft.

References

Penn State
Penn State Nittany Lions football seasons
ReliaQuest Bowl champion seasons
Penn State Nittany Lions football